Hostišová is a municipality and village in Zlín District in the Zlín Region of the Czech Republic. It has about 600 inhabitants.

Administrative parts
The municipality is made up of two village parts, Hostišová and Hostišová-Horňák.

Geography

It lies in a hilly lansdcape of the Vizovice Highlands.

History
The first written mention of Hostišová is from 1397.

Sights
The main landmark is the Chapel of the Visitation of the Virgin Mary from 1869.

An observation tower called Na Strážné is located on the top of the Strážná hill.

References

External links

Villages in Zlín District